EgyptAir Flight 843 was a flight from Cairo International Airport to Tunis–Carthage International Airport. On 7 May 2002, the Boeing 737-566 on the route crashed into a hill near Tunis–Carthage International Airport.  Of the 6 crew members and 56 passengers, 3 crew members and 11 passengers died, making a total of 14 fatalities.

Accident summary 

Flight 843 took off from Cairo International Airport on the afternoon of 7 May 2002 to Tunis Carthage International Airport in Tunis, Tunisia. The passengers consisted of 27 Egyptians, 16 Tunisians, 3 Algerians, 3 Jordanians, and 2 Britons. The aircraft was a Boeing 737-566. The flight crew members were Captain Ashraf Abdel-Aal (Arabic: أشرف عبدالعال) and First Officer Khalid Odeh (Arabic: خالد عودة). 

The plane was flying in instrument meteorological conditions (IMC) due to fog, rain and blowing sand on approach to runway 11 of Tunis-Carthage Airport. The aircraft crashed atop a hill in the Nahli area in the north of Tunis. Of the 6 crew and 56 passengers on board, 3 crew members (both flight crew members and one flight attendant) and 11 passengers were killed in the crash. The investigation found the Minimum safe altitude warning device at Tunis-Carthage did not cover the approach for Runway 11, and recommended studying ways to improve the volume of sky covered by the device in order to cover approaches to all the runways. The cause of the crash was a controlled flight into terrain.

According to the management of Carthage Airport, the pilots decided to carry out the normal landing at the airport. The accident occurred during the landing process. There are two theories regarding the accident:

 The first theory is that the landing gear failed to extend while the plane was on approach.  The pilot asked ATC to circle the airport while attempting to lower the landing gear while simultaneously dumping fuel, a standard precaution when anticipating a crash landing. The Tunisian Transport Minister believed that, because this type of aircraft can not quickly dump fuel, the pilot had to spend more time circling the airport in the mountainous terrain around Carthage. With the bad weather and poor visibility, the flight crew likely did not see the mountain until it was too late.  This account is supported by the lack of fire at the crash site.

 The second theory is that the plane did not suffer any technical fault, and that the bad weather and lack of visibility caused the pilot to descend below the minimum safe altitude for the Carthage airport.  An analysis of the flight data recorder and cockpit voice recorder did not reveal any indication that the landing gear had failed to deploy or that there were any unusual actions on the part of the crew or other circumstances apart from the terrible weather. EgyptAir's vice president of safety, Shaker Qilada, stated that there were no technical faults with the plane and that it was a normal landing procedure.

The plane broke into two halves and the back of the plane caught fire. As a result, most of the victims were sitting in the back of the plane. Rescue teams headed to the crash area to rescue the injured passengers and retrieve the bodies of those killed. Rescue workers reported having difficulty reaching the site of the crash in the rough terrain.

Survivor accounts 
One of the survivors said that "the plane had left Egypt normally, but when we entered the Tunisian airspace we found an unusual climatic situation that I had not seen since the year. And we stayed for about half an hour between the fog and could not see the surface of the earth at all," adding that "while the pilot was preparing to land at the airport in Tunisia, the plane suddenly crashed into the mountain, and that maybe something wrong from the pilot and something from the plane."

Aftermath 
After the accident, the U.S. National Transportation Safety Board sent a team of investigators to assist authorities in Tunisia with their investigation.  The team included representatives from Boeing and General Electric Engines.

Misr Insurance Company began paying compensation to EgyptAir for the disaster-ridden plane in Tunisia as well as compensation for victims and injured in accordance with the international agreement. The value of the plane's compensation amounted to 22 million dollars, or 110 million pounds.

See also 
EgyptAir Flight 990
EgyptAir Flight 648
List of accidents and incidents involving commercial aircraft

References

2002 disasters in Tunisia
Aviation accidents and incidents in Egypt
843
Aviation accidents and incidents in 2002
Aviation accidents and incidents in Tunisia
Accidents and incidents involving the Boeing 737 Classic
2002 in Tunisia
May 2002 events in Africa